The Generation 1 in NASCAR refers to the inaugural generation of post-war cars used between 1948 and 1966. The first generation of stock cars used a strictly-stock body and frame, the doors were strapped with the use of seat belts being required, and a heavy-duty rear axle was mandated to stop the cars from rolling over during a race. These cars were almost identical to their road-going counterparts, albeit with tuning and modifications to the car itself being prohibited. It was also notable for being the only generation of stock cars to use real doors. Examples include the Hudson Hornet, Oldsmobile Rocket 88, Ford Galaxie, Plymouth Belvedere, Pontiac Catalina, and the Chevrolet Impala.

They were eventually replaced by the Generation 2 cars in 1966.

Models

Chrysler Corporation 

 Hudson Hornet: 1950-1954
 Plymouth Belvedere: 1959
 Plymouth Superbird: 1970

Ford Motor Company 

 Ford Galaxie: 1958-1965
 Ford Thunderbird: 1959-1964

General Motors 

 Chevrolet Impala: 1955-1962
 Oldsmobile Rocket 88: 1949-1953
 Pontiac Catalina: 1950-1958

Studebaker

 Studebaker Starlight: 1949-1952

References 

NASCAR Cup Series
1940s in NASCAR
1950s in NASCAR
1960s in NASCAR
1964 endings
1948 beginnings